Dr. Abdi Shire Warsame, is a Somali diplomat who was the former Somali Ambassador to Iran and Kenya and former Foreign Affairs State minister in the Transitional National Government. He has played several roles in the past major Somali reconciliation conferences as well as holding several positions in the Transitional National Government.

References 

Year of birth missing (living people)
Living people
Government ministers of Somalia
Ambassadors of Somalia to Iran
Ambassadors of Somalia to Kenya
Ethnic Somali people
Somalian diplomats